Padma Kanya Multiple Campus is a women's college located in Bagbazar, Kathmandu. Founded on 17 September 1951, it is the oldest institution of its kind in Nepal.

References

External links

1951 establishments in Nepal
Educational institutions established in 1951
Universities and colleges in Nepal
Women's universities and colleges in Nepal